Claude Cannon Cornish (31 August 1888 – 25 June 1975) was an Australian rules footballer who played with Carlton in the Victorian Football League (VFL).

Notes

External links 

Claude Cornish's profile at Blueseum

1888 births
1975 deaths
Australian rules footballers from Victoria (Australia)
Carlton Football Club players
Prahran Football Club players